Van Blarcom House may refer to:

Van Blarcom House (Franklin Lakes, New Jersey), listed on the National Register of Historic Places in Bergen County, New Jersey
Van Blarcom House (Wyckoff, New Jersey), listed on the National Register of Historic Places in Bergen County, New Jersey
Albert Van Blarcom House, Wyckoff, New Jersey, listed on the National Register of Historic Places in Bergen County, New Jersey
Van Blarcom - Jardine House, Wyckoff, New Jersey, listed on the National Register of Historic Places in Bergen County, New Jersey